Billie Jean King and Martina Navratilova defeated Rosemary Casals and Wendy Turnbull in the final, 6–3, 4–6, 6–3 to win the doubles tennis title at the 1980 Avon Championships. It was King's fourth and last Tour Finals title, and Navratilova's third.

Françoise Dürr and Betty Stöve were the reigning champions, but did not qualify this year.

Seeds
  Billie Jean King /  Martina Navratilova (champions)
  Rosemary Casals /  Wendy Turnbull (final)

Draw

Draw

References
 Official Results Archive (ITF)
 Official Results Archive (WTA)

Doubles
1980 WTA Tour